The Tâmega line (Linha do Tâmega) was a  railway line in northern Portugal. It closely followed the course of the Tâmega River. It closed in 2009.

History
The southern part of the line opened in 1909; it ran between Livração (the junction with the main Douro line) and Amarante in the District of Oporto, near the River Tâmega. The line was eventually opened as far north as Arco de Baúlhe in 1949, the last such extension to Portugal's narrow gauge railway network. Livração station was a junction with the main Douro Valley railway line; it is still served by CP's  trains to and from Oporto.

Train services were operated by Comboios de Portugal (CP); the three Série 9100 diesel railcars were built in 1949 by the Swedish company NOHAB specifically for use on the Tâmega line. They continued in service until 2002 (when replaced by Série 9500 units, purchased secondhand from Yugoslavia). CP Série 9020 diesel locomotives were also used on the line.

Closure
The northern section of the line, between Amarante and Arco de Baúlhe, closed in 1990. Arco de Baúlhe station was served by trains for little over 40 years.

The remaining part of the line south of Amarante closed in 2009 - ostensibly due to the need for urgent repair work. The Strategic Transport Plan, published by the Portuguese Government in October 2011, showed that the Tâmega line required the highest level of subsidy (at €2.50 per passenger per kilometre) of any railway in Portugal and thus the line was listed for permanent closure. On 1 January 2012 the replacement bus service was also withdrawn.

Other narrow gauge railways in the Douro Valley
Corgo line - closed 2009
Sabor line - closed 1988
Tua line - closed 2008

See also 
 List of railway lines in Portugal
 List of Portuguese locomotives and railcars
 History of rail transport in Portugal

References

Railway lines in Portugal
Metre gauge railways in Portugal
Railway lines opened in 1909
Railway lines closed in 2009